Paul Freeman (born 18 January 1943) is an English actor who has appeared in theatre, television and film. In the United Kingdom, he is best known for his role in the romance TV series Yesterday's Dreams (1987) as Martin Daniels. Internationally, he is known for playing the rival archaeologist René Belloq in Raiders of the Lost Ark (1981), evil wine baron Gustav Riebmann on season 4 of the soap opera Falcon Crest (1984–85), supervillain Ivan Ooze in Mighty Morphin Power Rangers: The Movie (1995), Julius Morlang in Morlang (2001), Ray in When I'm 64 (2004), Reverend Shooter in Hot Fuzz (2007) and Shrewd Eddie in Hard Boiled Sweets (2012)

Referring to Freeman's extensive theatre work, in 1995 the Los Angeles Times described him as "one of Britain's best-regarded actors, classically trained, with stints at the Royal Shakespeare Company and the National Theatre".

Personal life
Freeman was born in Barnet, Hertfordshire, on 18 January 1943. He is married to Maggie Scott, who was his co-star in the 1980 film The Dogs of War. They have one daughter, Lucy. Freeman was previously married to actress Judy Matheson.

Paul and Maggie Scott are both co-founders of the charity UK Friends of Healing Focus (UKHF), which works in partnership with Uganda NGO, Healing Focus Orphanage Centre.

Career
He began his career in advertising and teaching, and landed small roles in the theatre, appearing in productions of A Midsummer Night's Dream and Hamlet. He had starring roles in the National Theatre and the Royal Shakespeare Company, and later co-founded the Joint Stock Theatre Company in 1974, along with director Max Stafford-Clark.

Freeman made his television debut in 1978 in the serial Will Shakespeare (1978). He also acted in the docudrama Death of a Princess, a film about the execution of Misha'al bint Fahd al Saud of Saudi Arabia. Freeman began his feature film career in 1980 when he appeared in The Long Good Friday and The Dogs of War. In 1981, he starred in the TV show Winston Churchill: The Wilderness Years.

In the same year, Steven Spielberg and George Lucas chose Freeman to play archaeologist René Belloq, the archrival to Indiana Jones, in the adventure film Raiders of the Lost Ark. The film led to Freeman becoming typecast in villainous roles, especially Nazis. He played the conniving wine baron Gustav Riebmann in the fourth season of Falcon Crest, airing in 1984–1985.

Paul Freeman starred as Martin Daniels in the series Yesterday's Dreams in 1987.

In 1988, he played Professor Moriarty in comedy film Without a Clue, which starred Michael Caine as Sherlock Holmes and Ben Kingsley as Watson. In 1995, he was cast as the villain Ivan Ooze in Mighty Morphin Power Rangers: The Movie.

Freeman guest-starred in television shows such as Monarch of the Glen, ER, Falcon Crest and The Young Indiana Jones Chronicles. He also played in several [ini-series, including Murderers Among Us: The Simon Wiesenthal Story (1989) and The Final Cut (1995). In 2004, Freeman played Angus, Bobby Jones' caddie, in Bobby Jones: A Stroke of Genius. During 2006 and 2007, he starred in the drama New Street Law. Also in 2007, he played Rev. Philip Shooter of Sandford in Hot Fuzz. He is also featured in several Travelers Insurance television commercials from 2007 to 2009.

Among his television work, Freeman has appeared in an episode of Midsomer Murders titled "Down Among the Dead Men". He also appeared in the Waking the Dead in the episode "Straw Dog", and played Adam Kingsley in the BBC adaptation of Minette Walters' The Dark Room. He was seen in Agatha Christie's Poirot in the episode "Appointment with Death" as Colonel Carbury.

He appeared as George Aaranow in the 2008 London revival of David Mamet's Glengarry Glen Ross.

In 2012, he played Thomas Erpingham in the BBC adaption of William Shakespeare's Henry V from The Hollow Crown series.

Filmography

Film

Television
 1967 – Champion House – Elwyn
 1972 – The Last of the Baskets – 1 Episode: "Since Then I Have Used No Other" − Bernard Rage
 1972 – Jason King – 1 Episode: "Zenia Male" − Revolutionary
 1972 – The Protectors – 1 Episode: "A Kind of Wild Justice" − Mechanic
 1973 – Coronation Street – 1 Episode: "Terry Slade"
 1974 – Crown Court – 1 Episode: "Good and Faithful Friends: Pt. 1" − Leonard Tyler
 1976 – Couples – 3 Episodes − Douglas Broom
 1976 – The XYY Man – 3 Episodes − Ray Lynch
 1978 – Scorpion Tales – 1 Episode: "The Great Albert" − Oliver Benthall
 1978 – Crown Court – 1 Episode: "The Song Not the Singer: Pt.1" − John Bernard
 1978 – Will Shakespeare – 6 Episodes − Dick Burbage
 1980 – Death of a Princess – Christopher Ryder
 1980 – Play for Today – 1 Episode: "A Walk in the Forest" − Alexander Kutsov
 1981 – Winston Churchill: The Wilderness Years – Ralph Wigram
 1981 – Play for Today – 1 Episode: "No Visible Scar" − Doctor
 1982 – BBC2 Playhouse – 1 Episode: "The Workshop" − Max
 1982 – Play for Today – 1 Episode: "Willie's Last Stand" − Willie
 1982 – Crown Court – 1 Episode: "Face Value: Pt. 1" − Defence Counsel
 1982 – Gavilan – 1 Episode: "Sarah and the Buzz" – Mr. Snow
 1984 – Cagney & Lacey – 1 Episode: "Victimless Crime" – Yves Benoit
 1984 − Mitch − 1 Episode: "Postman's Knock" − Harry Warren
 1984-1985 – Falcon Crest – 19 Episodes – Gustav Riebmann
 1987 – Yesterday's Dreams – Martin Daniels
 1989 − Pursuit / Twist of Fate 2 Episodes - SS-Oberfuhrer Mittendorf
 1992-1993 – The Young Indiana Jones Chronicles – 2 episodes – Frederick Selous
 1994 – Viper – 1 Episode: "Once a Thief" - Dr. Samuels
 1994 – Grushko – 2 Episodes – Bosenko
 1995 – The Final Cut – 4 Episodes – Tom Makepeace
 1996 – Tales from the Crypt – 1 Episode: "Smoke Wrings" – Alistair Touchstone
 1996 - Samson and Delilah (1996 miniseries) (TNT) - Manoah
 1998–2002 – ER – Dr. Charles Corday – 3 episodes
 2000 – Inspector Morse – 1 Episode: "The Remorseful Day" – Frank Harrison
 2002 – Monarch of the Glen – 11 Episodes – Andrew Booth
 2005 – Waking the Dead – 2 episodes: "Straw Dog" – Dr. Hoyle
 2006 – Midsomer Murders – 1 Episode: "Down Among The Dead Men" – Sir John Waverly
 2006–2007 – New Street Law – Laurence Scammel QC
 2006 – Number 13 – TV movie adaptation of M. R. James short story "Number 13" – Mr Harrington – Cathedral archivist
 2007 – Diamond Geezer – 1 Episode: "Old Gold" – Sergey
 2007 – The Whistleblowers – 2 Episodes: "Environment & Fit for Purpose" – Joseph Cole
 2007 – Hotel Babylon – 1 Episode – Sir Christopher Price
 2008 – Agatha Christie's Poirot – 1 Episode: "Appointment With Death" – Col. Carbury
 2009 – Lark Rise to Candleford – 1 Episode – Old Edmund
 2010 – Spooks – 1 Episode – Levi Cohen
 2012 – Strike Back – 2 Episodes - "Vengeance: Parts 5 & 6" – Peter Evans
 2013 – The Bible – Samuel – 2 episodes
 2013 – Lucan – 1 Episode – John Pearson
 2015 – Da Vinci's Demons – The Architect
 2016 – Tokyo Trial – William Donald Patrick, Lord Patrick
 2017–2020 – Absentia – Warren Byrne
 2018 – A Very English Scandal – Sir Joseph Cantley
 2022 – The Man Who Fell to Earth – 1 episode - "Unwashed and Somewhat Slightly Dazed" – Gregory Papel

References

External links
 

1943 births
20th-century English male actors
21st-century English male actors
English male film actors
English male Shakespearean actors
English male stage actors
English male television actors
English male voice actors
Living people
Male actors from Hertfordshire
People from Chipping Barnet